Weapons diversion is a situation in which weapons and ammunition are taken from their originally intended recipients. This can include equipment originally planned for use by the armed forces of one country being sold to a different country, but the most common cause of weapons diversion involves the capture of weapons during warfare. Weapons diversion can contribute to arms trafficking and other forms of organized crime.

Battlefield capture 
Across 321 cases involving 183 weapons and 3,600 rounds of ammunition, Conflict Armament Research found that 30% of all weapons diversion was due to battlefield capture. Of the weapons captured, 16% had been manufactured within the last eight years, meaning that diversion can occur within just a few years of the initial manufacture and export.

Prevention 
The prevention of weapons diversion was a significant part of the 2014 Arms Trade Treaty. As part of the treaty, signatories are required to implement mitigation measures in arms sales and to assess the likelihood of diversion.

References

External links 
The Loss of Arms and Ammunition in Peace Operations: Mapping and Addressing the Challenge (Jefferson Brehm, Global Peace Operations Review)
Making a Tough Job More Difficult: Loss of Arms and Ammunition in Peace Operations (Eric G. Berman et al, Small Arms Survey)

Arms control
Weapons trade
Organized crime activity